The Cicaré 4CT2 is an Argentine air-cooled, four-cylinder, horizontally opposed, two-stroke, piston engine designed and built by Cicaré Aeronáutica as a light, low cost engine.

Application
 Cicaré Helicopter # 1
 Cicaré CK.1

Specifications

See also

References

Notes

Bibliography

Cicaré aircraft
1970s aircraft piston engines